Bonobos are an endangered species of apes.

Bonobo may also refer to:
Bonobo (musician), British producer, musician and DJ
Bonobo (2014 film), a British comedy-drama film
Bonobo (2018 film), a Swiss short film
Bonobo (GNOME), a component framework

See also
 Bonobos (disambiguation)

th:โบโนโบ (แก้ความกำกวม)